"Kisses Sweeter than Wine" is a song by The Weavers.

Kisses Sweeter than Wine may also refer to:

"Kisses Sweeter Than Wine" (Frasier), series 3, episode 5
Kisses Sweeter than Wine, the autobiography of Boyd Clack

See also
"Sweeter than Wine", a 2001 single by Dionne Rakeem